The Daughter (also known as The Wrecker's Daughter) is an 1836 melodrama by the Irish writer James Sheridan Knowles. It premiered at the Theatre Royal, Drury Lane on 29 November 1836. The original cast included Sheridan Knowles himself as Martin, James Prescott Warde as Norris, John Cooper as Edward, Charles James Mathews as Clergyman, Thomas Cooke as Ambrose and Mary Warner as Marian.

Synopsis
It is set on the coast of Cornwall where wreckers rob the corpses of those washed ashore in shipwrecks. The heroine is horrified to discover her father is involved in these activities, particularly when his accomplices falsely accuses of his of actually murdering one of the victims.

References

Bibliography
 Mandeville, Gloria Estelle. A Century of Melodrama on the London Stage, 1790-1890. Columbia University, 1954.
 Nicoll, Allardyce. A History of Early Nineteenth Century Drama 1800-1850. Cambridge University Press, 1930.
 Slater, Michael. Charles Dickens. Yale University Press, 2011.

1836 plays
West End plays
Irish plays
British plays
Plays set in England
Plays by James Sheridan Knowles